Kingstone Press Cider is an English cider made from apples from an orchard in Malvern in Worcestershire. Kingstone Press is Aston Manor's main cider blend.

There are three different flavours; Kingstone Press Apple, Kingstone Press Pear and Kingstone Press Wild Berry.

Rugby league sponsorship
In early 2013, Kingstone Press became the title sponsor of the semi-professional Championship and Championship 1 and later became official partner of the England national team and official cider of the 2013 Rugby League World Cup. At the end of 2013, Kingstone Press became the main sponsor of the National Conference League, the top amateur competition in the UK. Towards the end of 2014, they extended their sponsorship to include the England national rugby league team and became the official cider partner of the Super League and Tetley's Challenge Cup

References

 FoodBev.com | News | Kingstone Press Wild Berry Cider
 Midlands Business News Kingstone Press Cider tackles Rugby League sponsorship | Midlands Business News
 RFL announces Kingstone Press as new sponsor of the Championship | Sport | The Guardian

External links
 Official website

English ciders